This is a list of Ghanaian films released in 2017.

References

2017
Ghana